Gowda may refer to:

Gowda (surname), a surname native to Karnataka, India
Vokkaliga, also known as Gowda, farming community in Karnataka
Tulu Gowda, a subsect of Vokkaliga from Karnataka, India
Arebhase Gowda a sub caste of Vokkkaliga from Karnataka,

See also
Gouda (disambiguation)